The Poet and the Lunatics: Episodes in the Life of Gabriel Gale is a 1929 work by G. K. Chesterton. It consists of a series of short stories about Gabriel Gale, who is a poet and painter. Every story involves another character who is mad in some way. The work is sometimes called a novel, and usually categorized as detective fiction.

The stories were first published in Nash's Magazine in 1921. John C. Tibbetts describes them as "among Chesterton's most evocative twilight tales."

References

External links
 The Poet and the Lunatics, complete text

Short stories by G. K. Chesterton
1929 short story collections
Books by G. K. Chesterton
Detective fiction short story collections
1921 short stories